FRMD4B is a gene which codes for FERM Domain Containing 4B, a scaffolding protein. It is found at chromosome 3p14.1.

References 

Genes on human chromosome 3